Paweł Borkowski (born 7 June 1959) is a Polish rower. He competed in the men's eight event at the 1980 Summer Olympics.

References

1959 births
Living people
Polish male rowers
Olympic rowers of Poland
Rowers at the 1980 Summer Olympics
Sportspeople from Toruń